A Kiwi drive is a holonomic drive system of three omni-directional wheels (such as omni wheels or Mecanum wheels), 120 degrees from each other, that enables movement in any direction using only three motors.  This is in contrast with non-holonomic systems such as traditionally wheeled or tracked vehicles which cannot move sideways without turning first.

This drive system is similar to the Killough platform which achieves omni-directional travel using traditional non-omni-directional wheels in a three wheel configuration.

Named after the Flightless national bird of New Zealand The Kiwi

References

Robotics